There have been several Catholic Church synods called the Council of Soissons:


 March 744: Presided over by Saint Boniface. Attended by Hartbert, bishop of Sens. Appointed Abel bishop.
 13 November 833: Presided over by Ebbo, archbishop of Rheims. Held at the church of St Mary. Deposed Louis the Pious and forced him to confess to various crimes.
 853: Declared the acts of Ebbo during his second episcopate invalid.
 18 August 866: Attended by Wenilo, archbishop of Rouen.
 1092-1093: Presided over by Renaud du Bellay, archbishop of Rheims. Condemned Roscellin's form of nominalism as a heretical tritheism. Its acts do not survive.

References

Bibliography
 .  & 

8th-century church councils
9th-century church councils
11th-century Catholic Church councils
Christianity in Francia